Rachel Pickup is a British theatre, television and film actress. Her first major role was as Kaye Bentley in the 10-part BBC TV series No Bananas, with Alison Steadman and Tom Bell. She has since appeared in many British and American TV shows and has worked extensively in theatre, playing most of the major Shakespearean heroines. She played Portia in The Merchant Of Venice at Shakespeare's Globe Theatre in London, opposite Jonathan Pryce. 

Pickup appeared in Chronic starring Tim Roth and directed by 2012 Un Certain Regard winner, Michel Franco.

Early life and education
Pickup was born in London, to an American mother, playwright Lans Traverse, and a British father, actor Ronald Pickup. She moved to New York in 2011. At the age of 16, Pickup won a place at the National Youth Theatre under the artistic directorship of Edward Wilson and subsequently was offered a place at the Royal Academy of Dramatic Art.

Career
Before graduating from RADA, Pickup won a leading role in the BBC series No Bananas, her first professional engagement. This was followed by a role opposite Alan Bates in Mike Poulton's Fortune's Fool. Other major theatre roles followed, including Irina in Mike Poulton's translation of Three Sisters for Bill Bryden, Olivia in Twelfth Night for Terry Hands, Helena in All's Well That Ends Well for Irina Brook, Portia in Julius Caesar for David Farr at the RSC, Sylvia in The Two Gentlemen of Verona and Helena in A Midsummer Night's Dream also for the RSC.

In 2003, Pickup appeared at The Old Vic in King Lear playing Cordelia. This was followed by Ophelia in Calixto Bieito's Hamlet, and Helen of Troy in Troilus and Cressida for Peter Stein.
She had a supporting role in the film Basil and AKA.

In 2011, she moved to the United States to appear in the Shakespeare Theatre Company's production of An Ideal Husband. In August 2011, she made her New York Off-Broadway debut in the Irish Repertory Theatre's 20th Anniversary production of Dancing at Lughnasa. Other productions at the Irish Repertory Theatre include Airswimming by Charlotte Jones for "Fallen Angel Theatre" and A Mind Bending Evening of Beckett for Robert Flanagan. In 2014, Pickup played Goneril at the new Polonsky Shakespeare Theatre for Theatre For A New Audience, in Brooklyn New York, opposite Michael Pennington's King Lear, and Amanda in director Darko Tresnjaks production of Private Lives at Hartford Stage, CT, opposite American actor Ken Barnett.

Pickup played Portia in The Merchant Of Venice at Shakespeare's Globe Theatre in London, England, opposite Jonathan Pryce, directed by Jonathan Munby, and appeared in the feature film Chronic directed by Michel Franco, which was part of the official selection for the Palme d'Or at the 2015 Cannes Film Festival. She had a cameo role as Fausta Grables in Wonder Woman.

Pickup appeared with her father for the first time in 2008 in an episode of Midsomer Murders:The Magician’s Nephew and played Molly, the central role in her mother's first screenplay "G - Litter" in 2015.

Pickup starred at the Criterion Theatre in The 39 Steps and has worked with Sir Peter Hall several times, including his 2009 revival of Bedroom Farce.

Awards
For Ophelia in Hamlet Pickup won a Herald Angel award. She also won a MEN Best Supporting Actress Award for her performance in Time and the Conways at the Royal Exchange theatre in Manchester. She was nominated for a Critics' Circle Best Actress Award for her performance in Miss Julie with Stephen Unwin at the Rose Theatre, Kingston.

Filmography

Film

Television

References

External links
 

1973 births
Living people
Alumni of RADA
Actresses from London
Actresses of American descent
English television actresses

English people of American descent
National Youth Theatre members